Marcus Wright may refer to:

 Marc Wright (Marcus Snowell Wright, 1890–1975), American athlete
 Marcus Joseph Wright (1831–1922), lawyer, author, and Confederate general 
 Marcus Wright, a character from Terminator Salvation